John Blackburne (baptised 1694 – 1786) was an English businessman, landowner and renowned amateur botanist.

He was the second son of wealthy salt merchant Jonathan Blackburne of Orford Hall, Warrington, Lancashire (but now Cheshire) and his first wife Anne Lever. He inherited Orford on the death of his father in 1724.

There in coal-fired hothouses he established a large exotic plant collection, amongst which were some of the earliest English specimens of pineapple, coffee, tea and sugarcane. He was assisted in his endeavours by his daughter Anna, who was herself to become a noted botanist. A detailed catalogue of the whole collection was produced in 1779 by the head gardener, Adam Neal, which has provided the basis of several books. Anna's natural history tutor, Dr Reinhold Forster, who later sailed as naturalist on Cook's second voyage, named a new genus of fan palm Sabal blackburniana in the family's honour.

Blackburne was selected High Sheriff of Lancashire for 1743–44 and in 1769 bought the lordship of the manor of Warrington.

He died in 1786 at the age of 93 and was buried at St Oswald's Church, Winwick. He had married Catherine Ashton and had 9 children. His eldest son Thomas, High Sheriff in 1763, predeceased him and thus his estate passed to Thomas' son, John, the Member of Parliament (MP) for Lancashire. His second son John became Mayor of Liverpool. A younger son Ashton emigrated to the United States and collected bird specimens, many of them new to science.

References

1694 births
1786 deaths
People from Cheshire
British industrialists
British botanists
High Sheriffs of Lancashire